The 2013 Virginia Cavaliers baseball team represented the University of Virginia in the 2013 NCAA Division I baseball season.   Head Coach Brian O'Connor is in his 10th year coaching the Cavaliers. They are coming off a 2012 season, in which they made it to the Charlottesville Regional in the NCAA Tournament.

Personnel

Schedule 

! style="background:#FF7F00;color:#0D3268;"| Regular Season
|- valign="top"

|- bgcolor="#ccffcc"
| February 15 || at  || 25 || Clark–LeClair Stadium || 14–4 || J. Sborz (1-0)||L. Hoffman (0-1)|| None || 3,511 || 1–0 || –
|- bgcolor="#ccffcc"
| February 16 || at East Carolina || 25 || Clark-LeClair Stadium || 13-9 ||W. Mayberry (1-0)||L. Lucroy (0-1)||None|| 2,483 || 2-0 || –
|- bgcolor="#ccffcc"
| February 18 || || 25 || Davenport Field|| 9-1 || T. Oest (1-0)||Z. Hopf (0-1)|| None || 2,333 || 3-0 || –
|- bgcolor="#ccffcc"
| February 19 ||   || 25 || Davenport Field || 11-2 || N. Howard (1-0)||M. Wainman (0-1)||None|| 2,251 || 4-0 || –
|- bgcolor="#ccffcc"
| February 22 ||  || 25 || Davenport Field || 15–0 ||B. Waddell (1-0)||R. Wilkinson (0-1)||None|| 2,246 || 5-0 || –
|- bgcolor="#ccffcc"
| February 23 || Toledo || 25 || Davenport Field || 5–0 ||S. Silverstein (1-0)||K. Shaw (1-1)|| W. Mayberry(1)|| 2,405 || 6–0 || –
|- bgcolor="#ccffcc"
| February 24 || Toledo || 25 || Davenport Field || 6–3 ||N. Kirby (1-0|| K. Slack (0-1)||J. Sborz(1)|| 2,536 || 7–0 || –
|- bgcolor="#ccffcc"
| February 27 ||  || 19 ||Davenport Field || 11-0 || T. Oest(2-0)||M. Kaplow (0-2)||None|| 2,266 || 8–0 || –
|-

|- bgcolor="#ccffcc"
| March 1 ||  || 19 || Davenport Field  || 3–0 ||B. Waddell (2-0)||S. Dodge (0-1)||J. Sborz(2)|| 2,437 || 9–0 || –
|- bgcolor="#ccffcc"
| March 2 ||  || 19 || Davenport Field || 12–4 || S. Silverstein (2-0)||D. Weigel (0-3)||None|| 2,240 || 10–0 || –
|- bgcolor="#ccffcc"
| March 2 || Harvard || 19 || Davenport Field || 11-5 ||W. Mayberry (2-0)||M. Timoney (0-1)||None|| 2,685 || 11–0 || –
|- bgcolor="#ccffcc"
| March 3 || Bucknell || 19 || Davenport Field ||9–1 ||N. Howard (2-0) || X. Hammond (0-2)||None||2,468|| 12–0 || –
|- bgcolor="#ccffcc"
| March 9 || *|| 17 || Davenport Field || 7-6 || K. Crockett (1-0) || J. Stinnett (1-1)|| None || 3,102 || 13-0 || 1-0
|- bgcolor="#ccffcc"
| March 9 || Maryland* || 17 || Davenport Field || 5-0 || S.  Silverstein (3-0)||B. Kirkpatrick (2-2) || None || 2,664 || 14-0 || 2-0
|- align="center" bgcolor="#ffbbb"
| March 10 || Maryland* || 17 || Davenport Field || 2-4 || K. Mooney (2-0) || N. Howard (2-1) || J. Stinnett(2) || 3,211 || 14-1 || 2-1
|- bgcolor="#ccffcc"
| March 13 ||  || 12 || Davenport Field || 7-2 ||T. Oest (3-0)||W. Martin (1-1)|| None || 2,364 || 15-1 || 2-1
|- bgcolor="#ccffcc"
| March 15 || at #26 Clemson* || 12 || Doug Kingsmore Stadium || 6-5 || K. Crockett (2-0) || M. Kent (0-1) || None || 4,823 || 16-1 || 3-1
|- align="center" bgcolor="#ffbbb"
| March 16 || at #26 Clemson* || 12 || Doug Kingsmore Stadium || 6-7 || Z. Erwin (1-0) || N. Kirby (1-1) || None || 5,006 || 16-2 || 3-2
|- bgcolor="#ccffcc"
| March 17 || at #26 Clemson* || 12 || Doug Kingsmore Stadium || 8-5 || N. Howard (3-1) || S. Firth (2-3) || None || 4,919 || 17-2 || 4-2
|- bgcolor="#ccffcc"
| March 19 ||  || 15 || Davenport Field || 14-3 || T. Oest (4-0) || B. Joseph (1-1) || None || 2,327 || 18-2 || 4-2
|- align="center" bgcolor="#cffcc"
| March 20 || Yale || 11 || Davenport Field || 10-0 || J. Sborz (2-0) || M. Coleman (0-2) || None || 2,316 || 19-2 || 4-2
|- bgcolor="#ccffcc"
| March 23 || #16 NC State* || 11 || Davenport Field || 8–2 || A. Young (1-0) || A. Woek (2-1) || None || 3,086 || 20-2 || 5–2
|- bgcolor="#ccffcc"
| March 23 || #16 NC State* || 11 || Davenport Field || 4-3 || S. Silverstein (4-0) || E. Ogburn (2-2) || K. Crockett(1) || 2,841 || 21-2 || 6–2
|- bgcolor="#ccffcc"
| March 24 || #16 NC State* || 11 || Davenport Field || 6–3 || A. Young (2-0) || Easley (1-1) || None || 2,446 || 22–2 || 7–2
|- bgcolor="#ccffcc"
| March 27 ||  || 5 || Davenport Field || 7–1 || N. Kirby (2-1) || N. Nowottnick (1-1) || None || 2,321 || 23–2 || 7–2
|- bgcolor="#ccffcc"
| March 29 || * || 5 || Davenport Field || 15-4 || A. Young (3-0) || C. Diaz (3-2) || None || 3,299 || 24-2 || 8-2
|- bgcolor="#ccffcc"
| March 30 || Miami (FL)* || 5 || Davenport Field || 8-1 || S. Silverstein (5-0) || B. Radziewski (3-1) || K. Crockett(2) || 4,258 || 25-2 || 9-2
|- align="center" bgcolor="#ffbbb"
| March 31 || Miami (FL)* || 5 || Davenport Field || 3–4 || T. Woodrey (4-0) || N. Howard (3-2) || E. Nedeljkovic(6) || 2,760 || 25-3 || 9-3
|-

|- bgcolor="#ccffcc"
|April 2 || at Liberty || 4 || Al Worthington Stadium || 2-0 || J. Sborz (3-0) || J. Richardson (0-1) || K. Crockett(3) || 2,543 || 26-3 || 9-3
|- bgcolor="#ccffcc"
|April 3 || VMI || 4 || Davenport Field || 8-6 || T. Oest (5-0) || A. Woods (2-1) || K. Crockett(4) || 2,745 || 27-3 || 9-3
|- bgcolor="#ccffcc"
|April 6 || at * || 4 || Gene Hooks Field || 7-6 || W. Mayberry (3-0) || C. Kaden (0-2) || K. Crockett(5) || 1,012 || 28-3 || 10-3
|- bgcolor="#ccffcc"
|April 7 || at Wake Forest* || 4 || Gene Hooks Field || 8-6 || A. Young (4-0) || N. Jones (2-1) || K. Crockett(6) || 977 || 29-3 || 11-3
|- bgcolor="#ccffcc"
|April 8|| at Wake Forest* || 4 || Gene Hooks Field || 9-7 || N. Howard (4-2) || M. Conway (1-1) || K. Crockett(7) || 626 || 30-3 || 12-3
|- align="center" bgcolor="#ffbbb"
|April 10 ||  || 4 || Davenport Field || 8-9 || D. Nelson (4-2) || A. Lewicki (0-1) || M. Costello(7) || 2,977 || 30-4 || 12-3
|- align="center" bgcolor="#ffbbb"
| April 12 || at #18 * || 4 || Russ Chandler Stadium || 1-2 || B. Farmer (8-1) || B. Waddell (2-2) || None || 1,621 || 30-5 || 12-4
|- bgcolor="#ccffcc"
| April 13 || at #18 Georgia Tech* || 4 || Russ Chandler Stadium || 7-2 || S. Silverstein (7-0) || D. Isaacs (4-4) || None || 1,884 || 31-5 || 13-4
|- align="center" bgcolor="#ffbbb"
| April 14 || at #18 Georgia Tech* || 4 || Russ Chandler Stadium || 2-3 || C. Pitts (5-3) || N. Howard (4-3) || J. King(2) || 1,273 || 31-6 || 13-5
|- bgcolor="#ccffcc"
| April 17 || Old Dominion || 9 || Davenport Field || 10-9 || K. Crockett (3-0) || B. Gero (3-3) || None || 2,797 || 32-6 || 13-5
|- bgcolor="#ccffcc"
| April 19 || #6 * || 9 || Davenport Field || 9-2 || B. Waddell (3-1) || L. Weaver (4-1) || None || 3,930 || 33-6 || 14-5
|- bgcolor="#ccffcc"
| April 20 || #6 Florida State* || 9 || Davenport Field || 2-0 || S. Silverstein (7-0) || B. Leibrandt (5-4) || K. Crockett(8) || 4,980 || 34-6 || 15-5
|- bgcolor="#ccffcc"
| April 21 || #6 Florida State* || 9 || Davenport Field || 5-2 || N. Howard (5-3) || S. Sitz (7-1) || K. Crockett(9) || 4,980 || 35-6 || 16-5
|- bgcolor="#ccffcc"
| April 23 || Richmond || 5 || Davenport Field || 6-2 || D. Rosenberger (1-0) || C. Bates (1-3) || None || 2,799 || 36-6 || 16-5
|- bgcolor="#ccffcc"
| April 24 ||  || 5 || Davenport Field Field || 16-8 || A. Young (5-0) || L. Drayer (2-3) || None || 3,063 || 37-6 || 16-5
|- bgcolor="#ccffcc"
| April 26 || Virginia Tech* || 5 || English Field || 15-6 || B. Waddell (4-1) || B. Markey (3-4) || W. Mayberry(2) || 3,142 || 38-6 || 17-5
|- align="center" bgcolor="#ffbbb"
| April 27 || Virginia Tech* || 5 || English Field || 3-5 || J. Mantiply (4-0) || S. Silverstein (7-1) || C. Labitan(6) || 2,681 || 38-7 || 17-6
|- align="center" bgcolor="#ffbbb"
| April 27 || Virginia Tech* || 5 || English Field || 6-11 || D. Burke (7-3) || N. Howard (5-4) || None || 1,161 || 38-8 || 17-7
|- bgcolor="#ccffcc"
| April 30 || at VCU || 7 || The Diamond || 11-3 || N. Kirby (3-1) || D. Black (0-2) || None || 4,104 || 39-8 || 17-7
|-

|- bgcolor="#ccffcc"
| May 10 || * || 8 || Davenport Field || 6-5 || N. Kirby (4-1) || Istler (3-5) || None || 3,369 || 40-8 || 18-7
|- bgcolor="#ccffcc"
| May 11 || Duke* || 8 || Davenport Field || 17-8 || S. Silverstein (8-1) || M. Matuella (4-3) || None || 4,040 || 41-8 || 19-7
|- bgcolor="#ccffcc"
| May 12 || Duke* || 8 || Davenport Field || 14-6 || K. Crockett (4-0) || R. Huber (5-6) || None || 4,646 || 42-8 || 20-7
|- bgcolor="#ccffcc"
| May 14 || VCU || 7 || Davenport Field || 17-3 || W. Mayberry (4-0) || D. Black (0-3) || None || 3,162 || 43-8 || 20-7
|- bgcolor="#ccffcc"
| May 16 || at #4 North Carolina* || 7 || Boshamer Stadium || 10-4 || B. Waddell (5-1) || K. Emanuel (9-3) || None || 3,095 || 44-8 || 21-7
|- align="center" bgcolor="#ffbbb"
| May 17 || at #4 North Carolina* || 7 || Boshamer Stadium || 5-8 || McCue (6-0) || K. Crockett (4-1) || T. Thornton(6) || 4,100 || 44-9 || 21-8
|- bgcolor="#ccffcc"
| May 18 || at #4 North Carolina* || 7|| Boshamer Stadium || 8-7 || Rosenberger (2-0) || McCue (6-1) || None || 4,100 || 45-9 || 22-8
|-

|- align="center" bgcolor="#ffbbb"
| May 22 || Virginia Tech || 7 || Durham Bulls Athletic Park || 1-10 || J. Mantiply (6-0) || B. Waddell (5-2) || None || 2,455 || 0-1
|- bgcolor="#ccffcc"
| May 23 || Georgia Tech || 7 || Durham Bulls Athletic Park || 8-2 || Silverstein (9-1) || Isaacs (4-7) || None || 2,998 || 1-1
|- bgcolor="#ccffcc"
| May 25 || Florida State || 7 || Durham Bulls Athletic Park || 7-4 || Nick Howard || Jameis Winston || None || 3,670 || 2-1
|-

|- bgcolor="#ccffcc"
| May 31 || (4)Army || 7 || Davenport Field || 2-1 || Waddell (6-2) || Rowley (9-4) ||Crockett (11)  || 3,826 || 1-0
|- bgcolor="#ccffcc"
| June 1 || (3)Elon || 7 || Davenport Field || 2-0 || Silverstein (10-1) || Medick (7-7) || Crockett (12) || 4,434 || 2-0
|- bgcolor="#ccffcc"
| June 2 || (3)Elon || 7 || Davenport Field || 11-3 || Rosenberger (3-0) || Young (2-2) ||  || 3,792 || 3-0
|-

|- align="center" bgcolor="#ffbbb"
| June 8 || Mississippi St. || 7 || Davenport Field || 6-11 || Graveman (7-5) || Waddell (6-3) || Mitchell (2) || 4,956 || 0-1
|- align="center" bgcolor="#ffbbb"
| June 10 || Mississippi St. || 7 || Davenport Field || 5-6 || Girodo (8-1) || Silverstein''' (10-2) || Holder (18) || 4,956 || 0-2
|-

|-
| style="font-size:88%" | Rankings from USA TODAY/ESPN Top 25 coaches' baseball poll. Parenthesis indicate tournament seedings.
|-
| style="font-size:88%" | *ACC Conference games

References 

Virginia Cavaliers
Virginia Cavaliers baseball seasons
2013 NCAA Division I baseball tournament participants
Virgin